USS Rigel (AD-13/ARb-1/AR-11) was an  destroyer tender named for Rigel, the brightest star in the constellation Orion.

Originally built in 1918 as SS Edgecombe by the Skinner and Eddy Corporation of Seattle, Washington for the United States Shipping Board, she was transferred to the United States Navy by Executive Order on 29 October 1921, delivered 16 November 1921, converted to a destroyer tender, and commissioned as USS Rigel on 24 February 1922.

Service history

1922–1941
Following an extensive fitting out period and shakedown, Rigel was homeported at San Diego. During the interwar period she remained in southern California. During 1941, she was briefly re-designayed as ARb-1, (a base repair ship).

1941–1942
Redesignated a repair ship, AR-11, on 10 April 1941, she underwent overhaul at Bremerton, Washington then sailed to Hawaii for more extensive repairs and alterations. By mid-July, she was at Pearl Harbor and was still in the yard on 7 December 1941. She was without her authorized armament and superstructure and was slightly damaged during the Japanese attack. Her crew, unable to fire, immediately turned their skills to rescue and salvage operations. Conversion work on Rigel was completed on 7 April 1942.

On 20 April, with four 3-inch guns mounted, she got underway for the South Pacific. Steaming first to Fanning Island, she disembarked U.S. Army units and material and embarked personnel of New Zealand's Pacific Island Force and civilian evacuees. On the 28th, she continued westward and on 16 May arrived at Auckland to add her equipment and personnel to the repair and construction facilities offered by that port. Between then and November she converted merchant ships and tugboats to Navy use, repaired other merchantmen, installed and repaired guns on merchant ships; trained armed guard crews, served as flagship for Vice Admiral Robert L. Ghormley, and as store ship and receiving ship; provided printing facilities; assisted in the construction of shore facilities; and added ten 20 mm guns to her own armament, in addition to her assigned duties of repairing Allied warships and auxiliaries.
 
In November, she was again called on to substitute as a transport. On the 8th, she embarked Army units and on the 9th, she sailed for New Caledonia. Arriving at Nouméa on 14 November, she shifted to Espiritu Santo two days later and contributed her skills to the Guadalcanal campaign.

1943–1944

In mid-January 1943, she shifted to Efate, and, on 24 April, got underway to return to the South Pacific where the 7th Amphibious Force was being formed. Rigel arrived at Sydney on 1 May, moved on to Brisbane on the 15th and until 14 June helped take the pressure off repair facilities there. But the 7th Amphibious Force's first assault landing was imminent and Rigel's assistance was needed in the forward area. On 21 June the repair ship arrived in Milne Bay, New Guinea, and on the 22nd Rear Admiral Daniel E. Barbey, Commander, 7th Amphibious Force, raised his flag. On the 30th, the force landed troops on Woodlark and Kiriwina and the encirclement of Rabaul from the south was initiated.
 
For the next 6 months Rigel remained at Milne Bay, repairing ships from LSTs, LCIs, and MTBs to tankers, cruisers, and battleships. By December, Allied forces had moved up the coast to dispute control of Vitiaz and Dampier Straits. In December, landings were made on New Britain at Arawe and Cape Gloucester, and in January 1944, at Finschhafen and Saidor in New Guinea. Rigel, no longer Admiral Barbey's flagship, soon followed.

Again bringing her vital equipment and trained men closer to the front, she moved to Cape Sudest, thence proceeded to Buna where her crew continued their round-the-clock schedule from 13 January until 9 June. From Buna she moved up the coast to Alexishafen, whence, in late August, she returned to Australia for a much needed overhaul. She was at Sydney during the initial thrust into the Philippines, but in November returned to New Guinea and continued her work at Hollandia, 22 November to 10 January 1945. On the latter date she got underway for the Philippines.

1945–1946
Rigel arrived in Leyte Gulf on 15 January. On the 16th she anchored in San Pedro Bay, where she remained through the end of the War. After brief postwar service, Rigel returned to the United States for inactivation. She was decommissioned on 11 July 1946 and was transferred to the Maritime Commission for disposal 12 July 1946, her final fate unknown.
 
Rigel earned four battle stars during World War II.

References

Notes

External links

 , Report of USS Rigel Pearl Harbor Attack]

Design 1079 ships
Ships built by Skinner & Eddy
1918 ships
Design 1079 ships of the United States Navy
Repair ships of the United States Navy
World War II auxiliary ships of the United States
Ships present during the attack on Pearl Harbor
Tenders of the United States Navy
Destroyer tenders of the United States